McKenzie Matthew "Mickey" Moniak (born May 13, 1998) is an American professional baseball outfielder for the Los Angeles Angels of Major League Baseball (MLB). Moniak was selected by the Philadelphia Phillies with the first overall pick of the 2016 MLB draft, and made his MLB debut with them in 2020.

Amateur career
Moniak attended La Costa Canyon High School in Carlsbad, California, and played center field for the baseball team. As a sophomore, he batted .461 with two home runs, and 27 runs batted in (RBI). As a junior, in 2015, Moniak hit .426 with a 1.062 on-base plus slugging (OPS). That August, he played in the Perfect Game All-American Classic at Petco Park.

In 2016, as a senior, Moniak batted .476 with a .961 slugging percentage and 40 runs, 12 triples (a San Diego Section record), seven home runs, and 46 RBI, in 29 games. He was named Baseball America High School Player of the Year, Gatorade California Baseball Player of the Year, and San Diego Section Player of the Year. Moniak committed to attend the University of California, Los Angeles (UCLA) to play college baseball for the UCLA Bruins.

Professional career

Philadelphia Phillies

Minor leagues
The Philadelphia Phillies selected Moniak with the first overall pick of the 2016 MLB draft. On June 20, 2016, he signed with the Phillies after agreeing to a $6.1 million signing bonus.

Moniak made his professional debut with the Rookie-level Gulf Coast Phillies in 2016. He spent all of his first professional season there, batting .284/.340/.409 with 27 runs (10th in the Gulf Coast League), 11 doubles (tied for 9th), four triples (tied for 8th), one home run, 28 RBI (9th), and 10 stolen bases (9th), in 176 at bats. Baseball America ranked Moniak the Number 17 prospect in baseball, and MLB.com ranked him Number 19.

Moniak spent 2017 with the Class A Lakewood BlueClaws, with whom he batted .236/.284/.341 with six triples (tied for 5th in the South Atlantic League), five home runs, 44 RBI, 11 stolen bases, and seven sacrifice flies (tied for 2nd) in 466 at bats in 123 games. Baseball America named him the best defensive player of his draft class, the second-best pure hitter (behind Nick Senzel), the second-best high school player (behind Bo Bichette), and the high school player closest to making his major league debut. Moniak spent the 2018 season with the Class A-Advanced Clearwater Threshers. He hit .270/.304/.383 with 28 doubles (second in the Florida State League), five home runs, 55 RBI, six stolen bases, and seven sacrifice flies (tied for 5th) in 433 at bats in 114 games.

In 2019, Moniak received an invitation to Phillies Major League spring training camp. He played the 2019 season with the Reading Fightin Phils of the Class AA Eastern League, batting .252/.303/.439 with 63 runs (9th in the league), 28 doubles (6th), 13 triples (leading the league), 11 home runs, 67 RBI (tied for 4th), 111 strikeouts (10th), and 15 stolen bases in 18 attempts in 465 at bats. Moniak was selected to play in the Eastern League All-Star Game midway through the season. He was chosen to play in the Arizona Fall League for the Scottsdale Scorpions following the season.

Major leagues
On September 16, 2020, Moniak was added to the Phillies’ 40-man roster, and was promoted to the major leagues for the first time. That night, he made his MLB debut against the New York Mets as a ninth-inning pinch runner for Alec Bohm, at Citizens Bank Park. On September 18, 2020, Moniak roped a line drive into right field, a single, for his first big league hit, in the second game of a doubleheader against the Toronto Blue Jays. 

On April 21, 2021, Moniak hit his first major league home run in the 2nd inning against Anthony DeSclafani of the San Francisco Giants.

After a strong Spring Training in 2022, it was announced that Moniak had made the Phillies’ Opening Day roster. However, Moniak suffered a right hand fracture in the final exhibition game against the Tampa Bay Rays on a Ryan Yarbrough hit-by-pitch. He was instead placed on the injured list to begin the season, and was given a recovery timetable of six weeks.

Los Angeles Angels
On August 2, 2022, Moniak was traded alongside prospect Jadiel Sanchez to the Los Angeles Angels for starting pitcher Noah Syndergaard. He made his Angels debut the next day, going 0-for-2 against the Oakland Athletics. In his first week with the Angels, Moniak went 4-for-14 (.286) with a pair of home runs in five games. On August 6, during a game against the Seattle Mariners, Moniak injured his left middle finger while attempting to bunt. The following day, the injury was diagnosed as a fracture; however, he was not expected to miss the remainder of the season. He returned from the injury on September 9 and was platooned with Jo Adell. On September 28, Moniak was hit on the hand by a pitch in a game against the Athletics. Although X-rays returned negative, the Angels placed him on the injured list, sidelining him for the final seven games of the season. Between the Phillies and the Angels, Moniak finished the 2022 season batting .170 with three home runs and eight RBIs in 37 games.

Personal life
Mickey Moniak’s grandfather, Bill Moniak, played six years in the Boston Red Sox organization.

References

External links

1998 births
Living people
People from Encinitas, California
Baseball players from San Diego
Major League Baseball outfielders
Philadelphia Phillies players
Los Angeles Angels players
Florida Complex League Phillies players
Lakewood BlueClaws players
Reading Fightin Phils players
Clearwater Threshers players
Scottsdale Scorpions players